Infant Annihilator are an English deathcore band formed in Hull, East Riding of Yorkshire in 2012 by drummer Aaron Kitcher and guitarist Eddie Pickard. The band are known for their technical, eclectic and extreme musical style; parodistic and satirically graphic lyrical content and shock humour; and music videos that feature ribald themes.

Their debut album The Palpable Leprosy of Pollution, which features the American vocalist Dan Watson, was released in late 2012. After replacing their vocalist with Massachusetts-native Dickie Allen, their second album The Elysian Grandeval Galèriarch was recorded and mixed by Jesse Kirkbride at his home studio Kirkbride Recordings and was released in 2016. Their third album, The Battle of Yaldabaoth, was released on 11 September 2019.

Infant Annihilator were described by the Hysteria Magazine as an internet band and even though they have stated that touring is a possibility, they have performed only as a studio project so far.

History

Formation and The PLOP debut album (2012–2013)
Infant Annihilator were formed in 2012 in Hessle near Kingston upon Hull by guitarist Eddie Pickard and drummer Aaron Kitcher. The name "Infant Annihilator" came from a song bearing the same title that was composed by Kitcher's previous band As the Blessed Fall, and was chosen as a parody of death metal band name stereotypes. In a 2016 interview, they explained "We wanted the song names and band name to be as completely over-the-top as our music..."

Pickard and Kitcher wrote and created homemade recordings together using a form of recording software on Pickard's computer. They wrote, recorded and edited the instrumental tracks for their debut album, The Palpable Leprosy of Pollution (abbreviated The PLOP). After releasing instrumental songs online, the pair met American vocalist Dan Watson from Indiana online, who discovered Infant Annihilator on Facebook. Pickard and Kitcher were impressed with his performance, and asked of him to perform vocals for the album. They soon began garnering viral popularity online—growing to around 20,000 "likes" within a month—with the release of the music video for their song "Decapitation Fornication".

Following the release of the video, the group promoted the release for their debut album The Palpable Leprosy of Pollution, which was released on 12 December 2012 (12/12/12). The idea to release the album on 12/12/12 was an idea pitched by Watson, which the band loved. However, Watson retrospectively has expressed regret for such a release date as it caused him to rush his work in order to get the album released on time, leaving him ultimately unhappy with the end result of his vocals.

Watson left the band in late 2013 and publicly announced his departure from the band 22 February 2014. He later explained that he left the band because he did not feel like an equal compared to the other two members, and also because he was upset over the two members agreeing to a contract without consulting his input first. After his leaving, Watson would later form the Washington-based deathcore group Enterprise Earth with guitarist BJ Sampson.

Dickie Allen and The EGG (2014–2017) 
In late 2014, while he was drumming for fellow UK band Desolated during their first US tour, Kitcher met vocalist Dickie Allen in person for the first time. The tour line-up included the band Traitors, who had brought Allen, a close friend, along with them on the tour. Hearing Allen's vocals in person convinced Kitcher that he was a good fit for the band. Infant Annihilator announced via social media on 1 June 2016 that they had brought on Dickie Allen as their new vocalist.

Infant Annihilator's second album The Elysian Grandeval Galèriarch (abbreviated The EGG) was officially released 29 July 2016. The album was Infant Annihilator's first to chart, making it onto several Billboard charts, including the Top Heatseekers, Independent Albums, Top Album Sales, Top Rock Albums, and Top Hard Rock Albums charts.

Third album The BOY (2019–present) 
On 25 July, Infant Annihilator posted a music video for their first single "Three Bastards" to YouTube, along with the upcoming album’s release date, title, art, track list, and preorder information. The Battle of Yaldabaoth (abbreviated The BOY) was released on 11 September.

Musical style and influences
Infant Annihilator's musical style has been described as both deathcore and technical death metal. Their lyrical content is intentionally extreme and covers controversial topics such as rape, paedophilia, murder, infanticide, "mass programming", religion, cult, and the Catholic Church. These topics are derived from the history of sexual abuse in the Catholic Church. In September 2017, their music was deemed "too offensive" and was pulled from the online music streaming platforms Spotify and iTunes as a result. They were soon returned to both platforms after three days.

They have listed various subgenres of death metal and hardcore punk to be influential to their music, including: deathcore, slam death metal, technical death metal, “down-tempo hardcore”, grindcore and mathcore.

Artists they have taken influence from include: Carnifex, Bring Me the Horizon (early deathcore era, à la Count Your Blessings), System of a Down, Slipknot, Chimaira, Despised Icon, Thy Art Is Murder, The Black Dahlia Murder, Beneath the Massacre, Cattle Decapitation, Waking the Cadaver, and GG Allin.

Members

Current

 Aaron Kitcher – drums (2012–present)
 Eddie Pickard – guitar, bass (2012–present) 
 Dickie Allen – vocals (2016–present) 

Former
 Dan Watson – vocals (2012–2014)

Timeline

Discography
Studio albums

Singles
"Decapitation Fornication" (23 July 2012)
"Motherless Miscarriage" (22 June 2016)
"Three Bastards" (25 July 2019)
"Swinaecologist" (31 August 2019)

Promotional releases
The Palpable Leprosy of Pollution – Promo (2012)

References

External links 

 

British musical trios
English deathcore musical groups
Deathcore musical groups
Musical groups established in 2012
Musicians from Kingston upon Hull
English death metal musical groups
2012 establishments in England